The flip angle is the rotation of the net magnetization vector by a radiofrequency pulse relative to the main magnetic field.

To improve the signal when Magnetic Resonance imaging, the flip angle needs to be chosen using the Ernst angle.

Magnetic resonance imaging